The 1882 Invercargill mayoral election was held on 29 November 1882.

John Kingsland was elected mayor.

Results
The following table gives the election results:

References

1882 elections in New Zealand
Mayoral elections in Invercargill